Abderrahmane Hammadi (born 24 March 1984) is an Algerian former track and field athlete who specialised in the 400 metres hurdles. He competed internationally for Algeria between 2003 and 2011.

He was the gold medallist at the 2011 All-Africa Games and the 2007 Pan Arab Games. His personal best is 49.84 seconds, which is a former Algerian national record and set during a silver medal run at the 2008 African Championships in Athletics. He was also the winner at the 2011 Arab Athletics Championships.

Hammadi began his international career with a bronze medal at the 2003 African Junior Athletics Championships and followed up with a senior bronze at the Islamic Solidarity Games two years later. He won his first Algerian national title in the 400 m hurdles in 2006.

He was a two-time participant at the Summer Universiade (2007, 2009).

International competitions

References

External links

Living people
1984 births
Algerian male hurdlers
African Games gold medalists for Algeria
African Games medalists in athletics (track and field)
Athletes (track and field) at the 2007 All-Africa Games
Athletes (track and field) at the 2011 All-Africa Games
Islamic Solidarity Games competitors for Algeria
Islamic Solidarity Games medalists in athletics
21st-century Algerian people